Heterothrips aesculi is a species of thrips in the family Heterothripidae. It is found in North America.

References

Further reading

 
 
 
 

Thrips
Articles created by Qbugbot
Insects described in 1915